Davis Alan Martin (born January 4, 1997) is an American professional baseball pitcher for the Chicago White Sox of Major League Baseball (MLB). He made his MLB debut in 2022.

Amateur career
Martin attended Central High School in San Angelo, Texas where he played baseball and football. As a senior in 2015, he went 9-1 with a 0.29 ERA and 116 strikeouts. After high school, he enrolled at Texas Tech University to play college baseball. In 2018, his junior year, he went 7-6 with a 4.87 ERA over 17 starts. After his junior season, he was selected by the Chicago White Sox in the 14th round of the 2018 Major League Baseball draft and signed.

Professional career
Martin spent his first professional season in 2018 with the Arizona League White Sox and the Great Falls Voyagers. In 2019, he played with the Kannapolis Intimidators. After not playing a game in 2020 due to the cancellation of the season, he spent 2021 with the Winston-Salem Dash and Birmingham Barons. He opened the 2022 season with Birmingham and was promoted to the Charlotte Knights during the season.

On May 17, 2022, the White Sox selected Martin's contract and promoted him to the major leagues. He made his MLB debut that day as the starting pitcher versus the Kansas City Royals. He pitched five innings in which he gave up one earned run, which was an RBI double in the second inning, while striking out seven, taking the loss as the White Sox fell 2–1. The next day, Martin was sent back to Charlotte. He was recalled and optioned twice in June.

References

External links

1997 births
Living people
Sportspeople from Abilene, Texas
Baseball players from Texas
Major League Baseball pitchers
Chicago White Sox players
Texas Tech Red Raiders baseball players
Great Falls Voyagers players
Kannapolis Intimidators players
Winston-Salem Dash players
Birmingham Barons players
Charlotte Knights players
Arizona League White Sox players